Mind the Acoustic Pieces is the first studio album by Maiden uniteD. It is an all-acoustic reinterpretation of the 1983 Iron Maiden album Piece of Mind with rearranged music for an acoustic setting

Background
Joey Bruers and Ruud Jolie rewrote the entire Piece of Mind album for their Maiden uniteD project. Maiden uniteD is a project that plays Iron Maiden songs acoustically with new arrangements, featuring guest musicians from different bands.

Track listing

Single and different album versions
The single "The Trooper" was released on November 20, 2010 featuring an alternate version of "Sun and Steel" with Anneke van Giersbergen on vocals.
Mind the Acoustic Pieces was released on CD December 9, 2010.
On April 1, 2011, Maiden uniteD released a limited vinyl edition of the album featuring the alternate version of "Sun and Steel" with Anneke van Giersbergen on vocals.

Personnel
Damian Wilson: Vocals 
Ruud Jolie: Guitar 
Joey Bruers: Bass 
Marco Kuypers: Piano 
Mike Coolen: Drums 
Anneke van Giersbergen: Guest vocals on "To Tame a Land" and on "Sun and Steel" (vinyl edition)

External links
 Maiden uniteD - Official Website

References

2010 albums